The Communauté d'agglomération Val Parisis is the communauté d'agglomération, an intercommunal structure, in the northwestern suburbs of Paris. It is located in the Val-d'Oise department, in the Île-de-France region, northern France. It was created in January 2016. Its seat is in Beauchamp. Its area is 87.2 km2. Its population was 278,166 in 2018.

Composition
The communauté d'agglomération consists of the following 15 communes:

Beauchamp
Bessancourt
Cormeilles-en-Parisis
Eaubonne
Ermont
Franconville
Frépillon
La Frette-sur-Seine
Herblay-sur-Seine
Montigny-lès-Cormeilles
Pierrelaye
Le Plessis-Bouchard
Saint-Leu-la-Forêt
Sannois
Taverny

References

Val Parisis
Val Parisis